Harrie Lewis Hattam (7 July 1890 – 12 January 1947) was an Australian rules footballer who played with St Kilda in the Victorian Football League (VFL).

Notes

External links 

1890 births
1947 deaths
Australian rules footballers from Melbourne
St Kilda Football Club players
Oakleigh Football Club players
People from Footscray, Victoria